Zoe Karbonopsina, also Karvounopsina or Carbonopsina, , was an empress and regent of the Byzantine Empire. She was the fourth spouse of the Byzantine Emperor Leo VI the Wise and the mother of Constantine VII, serving as his regent from 913 until 919.

Early life
Zoe Karbonopsina was born into a Greek family. She was a relative of the chronicler Theophanes the Confessor and a niece of the admiral Himerios.

Empress
Desperate to sire a son, Leo VI married his mistress Zoe on 9 January 906, only after she had given birth to the future Constantine VII at the end of 905.  However, this constituted his fourth marriage and was therefore un-canonical in the eyes of the Eastern Orthodox Church, which had already been reluctant to accept his third marriage to Eudokia Baïana, who died in childbirth in 901.

Although the Patriarch Nicholas Mystikos reluctantly baptized Constantine, he forbade the emperor from marrying for the fourth time. Leo VI married Zoe with the assistance of a cooperative priest, Thomas, but Nicholas' continued opposition to the marriage led to his removal from office and replacement by Euthymios in 907. The new patriarch attempted a compromise by defrocking the offending priest but recognizing the marriage.

Regency
When Leo died in 912, he was succeeded by his younger brother Alexander, who recalled Nicholas Mystikos and expelled Zoe from the palace. Shortly before his death, Alexander provoked a war with Bulgaria. Zoe returned upon Alexander's death in 913, but Nicholas forced her to enter the convent of St. Euphemia in Constantinople after obtaining the promise of the senate and the clergy not to accept her as empress. However, Nicholas' unpopular concessions to the Bulgarians later in the same year weakened his position and in 914 Zoe was able to overthrow Nicholas and replace him as regent. Nicholas was allowed to remain patriarch after reluctantly recognizing her as empress.

Zoe governed with the support of imperial bureaucrats and the influential general Leo Phokas the Elder, who was her favorite. Zoe's first order of business was to revoke the concessions to Simeon I of Bulgaria, including the recognition of his imperial title and the arranged marriage between his daughter and Constantine VII. This renewed the war with Bulgaria, which began badly for the Byzantines who were distracted by military operations in Southern Italy and on the eastern frontier. In 915 Zoe's troops defeated an Arab invasion of Armenia, and made peace with the Arabs.  This freed her hands to organize a major expedition against the Bulgarians, who had raided deep into Byzantine Thrace and captured Adrianople. The campaign was planned on a grand scale and intended the bribing and transportation of Pechenegs into Bulgaria by the imperial fleet from the north.

However, the Pecheneg alliance failed, and Leo Phokas was crushingly defeated in the Battle of Anchialus and again at the Battle of Katasyrtai, both in 917. Zoe tried to ally with Serbia and the Magyars against Simeon. This also failed to produce any concrete results, and the Arabs, encouraged by the empire's weakness, renewed their raids. A humiliating treaty with the Emirate of Sicily, who were asked to help subdue revolts in Italy, did little to improve the position of Zoe and her supporters.

Later life
In 919, there was a coup involving various factions, but the opposition to Zoe and Leo Phokas prevailed; in the end the admiral Romanos Lekapenos took power, married his daughter Helena Lekapene to Constantine VII, and forced Zoe back into the convent of Euphemia.

References

The Oxford Dictionary of Byzantium, Oxford University Press, 1991.

9th-century births
10th-century deaths
Macedonian dynasty
Byzantine regents
10th-century Byzantine empresses
10th-century viceregal rulers
Mistresses of Byzantine royalty
Constantine VII
Mothers of Byzantine emperors
10th-century women rulers